The 2021 EchoPark 250 was a NASCAR Xfinity Series race held on March 20, 2021. It was contested over 163 laps on the  oval. It was the sixth race of the 2021 NASCAR Xfinity Series season. JR Motorsports driver Justin Allgaier, collected his first win of the season.

Report

Background
Atlanta Motor Speedway (formerly Atlanta International Raceway) is a track in Hampton, Georgia, 20 miles (32 km) south of Atlanta. It is a  quad-oval track with a seating capacity of 111,000. It opened in 1960 as a  standard oval. In 1994, 46 condominiums were built over the northeastern side of the track. In 1997, to standardize the track with Speedway Motorsports' other two  ovals, the entire track was almost completely rebuilt. The frontstretch and backstretch were swapped, and the configuration of the track was changed from oval to quad-oval. The project made the track one of the fastest on the NASCAR circuit.

Entry list 

 (R) denotes rookie driver.
 (i) denotes driver who is ineligible for series driver points.

Qualifying
Austin Cindric was awarded the pole for the race as determined by competition-based formula. Jordan Anderson, Ronnie Bassett Jr., and Andy Lally did not have enough points to qualify for the race.

Starting Lineups

Race

Race results

Stage Results 
Stage One
Laps: 40

Stage Two
Laps: 40

Final Stage Results 

Laps: 83

Race statistics 

 Lead changes: 6 among 5 different drivers
 Cautions/Laps: 7 for 37
 Time of race: 2 hours, 10 minutes, and 5 seconds
 Average speed:

References 

NASCAR races at Atlanta Motor Speedway
2021 in sports in Georgia (U.S. state)
EchoPark 250
2021 NASCAR Xfinity Series